Ottoman railways may refer to:

Chemins de Fer Ottomans d'Anatolie an Ottoman railway company located in Central Anatolia of the Ottoman Empire.
The Syria Ottoman Railway Company
Baghdad Railway
Hejaz railway
Other railways of the Ottoman Empire

For a history of railways in the parts of the Ottoman Empire subsequently becoming the Republic of Turkey both before and after 1927 see History of rail transport in Turkey

For descendent railway systems see also:
Rail transport in Turkey
Rail transport in Syria
Rail transport in Iraq
Rail transport in Lebanon
Rail transport in Israel
Rail transport in Egypt
Palestine Railways 1920-1948